This is a list of people who have served as Lord Lieutenant for South Glamorgan. The office was created on 1 April 1974.

Sir Cennydd George Traherne, K.G., T.D.† 1 April 1974 – 1985
 Lieutenant of South Glamorgan Sir Hugo Boothby, 14th Baronet 1 April 1974 – 30 May 1986?
Susan Eva Williams 1985–1990
Sir Norman Lloyd-Edwards 11 September 1990 – 13 June 2008
Peter Beck  14 June 2008 - 4 July 2016 
Morfudd Meredith  5 July 2016 - 

† Also Lord Lieutenant of Mid Glamorgan and West Glamorgan. Each of the three Counties had a separate Lieutenant serving under the joint Lord Lieutenancy. Three separate Lord Lieutenants were appointed on his retirement

References

South Glamorgan
Glamorgan South
 
1974 establishments in Wales